Niittykumpu (Finnish) or Ängskulla (Swedish) is an underground station on the western metro extension (Länsimetro) of the Helsinki Metro. The station is located 1,9 kilometres east from Matinkylä metro station and 1,1 kilometres west from Urheilupuisto metro station.

References

External links
Länsimetro work in progress

Helsinki Metro stations
2017 establishments in Finland